Sam Day (1802–66) was an English jockey who won The Derby on 3 occasions: in 1821 aboard the grey Gustavus, in 1830 on Priam and once again atop Pyrrhus The First in the 1846 Derby. He also won a 1,000 Guineas / Oaks double in 1846 on Mendicant.

The son of John Day, and brother of John Barham Day, he became apprenticed to a trainer called Cooper, who trained for the Duke of York in Newmarket. After his second Derby win, he retired to a farm near Reading, but when this was not a financial success he wasted back down to 7 stone 12 pounds and, with help from his nephew John, resumed riding. When eventually he retired again, he trained on a small scale at Ascot.

He was one of several horsemen from the Day family, but was reputed to be more honest than other family members. He was a cheerful, hardy man and a tough, wiry, elegant rider.

See also
List of significant families in British horse racing

References

Bibliography

English jockeys
19th-century English people